Harish Sivaramakrishnan  is an Indian playback singer and lead vocalist of the Bangalore-based popular Carnatic progressive rock band Agam.

Personal life 

Harish was born and brought up at Shoranur in Palakkad, Kerala. He is 38 years old. He is a chemical engineering graduate from BITS Pilani.

Career 
Harish Sivaramakrishnan is the lead vocalist and one of the founder members of the band Agam. He is also a playback singer working in Malayalam, Telugu and Tamil languages. Apart from his musical career, he is also working as the Chief Design Officer at CRED, after working for over a decade in Adobe and Google.

Discography

Films

Albums

Other works

Awards
South Indian International Movie Awards:

2021– Best Playback Singer (Male) (Tamil)  – Soorarai Pottru – "Veyyon Silli"

References

External links 

Year of birth missing (living people)
Living people
Indian playback singers